Elsijane Trimble Roy (April 2, 1916 – January 23, 2007) was an associate justice of the Arkansas Supreme Court and a United States district judge of the United States District Court for the Eastern District of Arkansas and the United States District Court for the Western District of Arkansas.

Education and career
Born in Lonoke, Arkansas, Roy received a Juris Doctor from the University of Arkansas School of Law in 1939. She was in private practice in Lonoke in 1939, and in Little Rock in 1940. She was an attorney for the Arkansas State Department of Revenue in Little Rock from 1941 to 1942.

She was in private practice in Blytheville, Arkansas from 1945 to 1963. She was a law clerk for Justice Frank Holt of the Supreme Court of Arkansas from 1963 to 1965.

She was a Circuit Judge of the Sixth Judicial District of Arkansas in 1966. She was an assistant state attorney general of the State of Arkansas in 1967, and was then a law clerk for Judge Gordon E. Young of the United States District Court of the Eastern District of Arkansas from 1967 to 1969, and a senior law clerk for Judge Paul X. Williams of the United States District Court of the Western District of Arkansas from 1970 to 1975. She was an associate justice of the Arkansas Supreme Court from 1975 to 1977.

Federal judicial service

On October 21, 1977, Roy was nominated by President Jimmy Carter to a joint seat on the United States District Court for the Eastern District of Arkansas and the United States District Court for the Western District of Arkansas vacated by Judge Oren Harris.

She was confirmed by the United States Senate on November 1, 1977, and received her commission on November 2, 1977. She assumed senior status on January 1, 1989. On December 1, 1990, Roy was reassigned to sit on only the Eastern District of Arkansas, and served in that capacity until her death, in Little Rock on January 23, 2007.

Family

She was the daughter of Thomas Clark Trimble III and Elsie Jane Walls. She married lawyer James Morrison Roy on November 23, 1944, they divorced in 1967, they had one son. She and her husband had a law firm of Roy and Roy, dissolved in 1963.

See also
List of first women lawyers and judges in California

References

1916 births
2007 deaths
Justices of the Arkansas Supreme Court
Judges of the United States District Court for the Western District of Arkansas
Judges of the United States District Court for the Eastern District of Arkansas
United States district court judges appointed by Jimmy Carter
20th-century American judges
University of Arkansas School of Law alumni
20th-century American women judges